Johannes Jakobus Styger  (born 31 January 1962) is a South African former rugby union player, who played loosehead prop.

Playing career
Styger made his provincial debut for Northern Transvaal in 1983. In 1987 he joined Free State and continued his career in Bloemfontein.

He made his test debut for the Springboks as a replacement for Heinrich Rodgers after 24 minutes in the second half in the test against the New Zealand All Blacks on 15 Augustus 1992 at Ellis Park in Johannesburg. His first start for the Springboks was in the next test on 22 August 1992 at Newlands in Cape Town against Australia. Styger toured with the Springboks to France and England in 1992 and to Australia in 1993. He played in seven test matches and eleven tour matches for the Springboks.

Test history

See also
List of South Africa national rugby union players – Springbok no.  566

References

1962 births
Living people
South African rugby union players
South Africa international rugby union players
Blue Bulls players
Free State Cheetahs players
Rugby union players from Bloemfontein
Alumni of Grey College, Bloemfontein
Rugby union props